Mircea Gheorghiu (born 8 August 1948) is a Romanian gymnast. He competed in eight events at the 1972 Summer Olympics.

References

1948 births
Living people
Romanian male artistic gymnasts
Olympic gymnasts of Romania
Gymnasts at the 1972 Summer Olympics
Gymnasts from Bucharest